Charley's Aunt is a 1934 German comedy film directed by Robert A. Stemmle and starring Fritz Rasp, Paul Kemp, and Max Gülstorff. It is based on the British writer Brandon Thomas's 1892 play Charley's Aunt. The film's sets were designed by art director Franz Schroedter.

Cast

References

Bibliography

External links 
 

1934 films
1934 comedy films
Films of Nazi Germany
German comedy films
1930s German-language films
Films directed by Robert A. Stemmle
Films based on Charley's Aunt
Films set in England
German black-and-white films
1930s German films